Guy R. Sturdy (August 7, 1899 – May 4, 1965) was a professional baseball player.  He was a first baseman over parts of two seasons (1927–1928) with the St. Louis Browns.  For his career, he compiled a .288 batting average and one home run in 66 at-bats, with 13 runs batted in.

Sturdy was born in Sherman, Texas. After his playing careers, he managed in the minor leagues for 12 seasons, including one season in his hometown, leading the Sherman Twins to a 70–70 record in 1946. Sturdy died in Marshall, Texas, at the age of 65.

References

External links

1899 births
1965 deaths
St. Louis Browns players
Major League Baseball first basemen
Baseball players from Texas
Joplin Miners players
Little Rock Travelers players
Muskogee Athletics players
Tulsa Oilers (baseball) players
Milwaukee Brewers (minor league) players
Birmingham Barons players
Houston Buffaloes players
New Orleans Pelicans (baseball) players
San Antonio Missions players
Johnstown Johnnies players
Baltimore Orioles (IL) managers
Baltimore Orioles (IL) players
Marshall Tigers players
El Dorado Lions players